The North African Championship is an old football competition organized in North Africa since 1920 to 1956, it pits the champions of the five North African leagues against each other at the end of the season to set the North African Champion. It disappears at the end of the 1955-1956 edition after the independence of Morocco and Tunisia.

Winners of unofficial editions
Was organized by the Union des Sociétés Françaises de Sports Athlétiques.

1912 : FC Blidéen (Blida)
1913 : SC Bel Abbès (Sidi Bel Abbès)
1914 : Gallia Sports (Algiers)
1915-19 : Not played
1920 : Racing Club (Tunis)

Winners of the North African Championship 
Was organized by the Union des Ligues Nord-Africaines de Football hosted by the French Football Federation.

Winners by team

NTB: 
 ES Guelma (ex. ESFM Guelma)

Winners by league

Notes

External links
The Rec.Sport.Soccer Statistics Foundatation

Defunct international club association football competitions in Africa
French Algeria
Sport in North Africa